The ACF River Basin is the drainage basin, or watershed, of the Apalachicola River, Chattahoochee River, and Flint River, in the Southeastern United States.

This area is alternatively known as simply the Apalachicola Basin and is listed by the United States Geological Survey as basin HUC 031300, as well as sub-region HUC 0313. It is located in the South Atlantic-Gulf Water Resource Region, which is listed as HUC 03. The basin is further sub-divided into 14 sub-basins.

Geography
The ACF River Basin begins in the mountains of northeast Georgia, and drains much of metro Atlanta, most of west Georgia and southwest Georgia and adjoining counties of southeast Alabama, before it splits the central part of the Florida Panhandle and flows into the Gulf of Mexico at Apalachicola Bay, near Apalachicola, Florida. It drains an area of 20,355 square miles.  Most of the northern half of the basin abuts the Eastern Continental Divide on the east, and the ACT River Basin to the west.

Listing of Water Resource Sub-Basins

Water wars
These states and Alabama have been involved in a water-use dispute for two decades, known as the Tri-state water dispute.  Georgia has also lobbied the United States Congress to end navigation on the Appalachicola and lower Chattahoochee, to conserve more water during droughts.  Keeping the two rivers at a navigable depth during these times requires large releases from dams upstream, sending potential drinking water downstream for shipping, and often dropping lakes to levels dangerous to boaters.

Conservation
Other ecological conservation and economic concerns include protecting harvests of oysters in Apalachicola Bay, which require a large enough flow of fresh water to prevent excessive saltwater intrusion from the Gulf.

Numerous endangered and imperiled species occur in the basin, including many endemic mussels 

The cost of dredging silt, much of it from uncontrolled growth across metro Atlanta's fine red clay soil, has also been called wasteful to float so little ship traffic.

References

External links

U.S. Army Corps of Engineers: ACF Basin website 
Florida DEP: Apalachicola River Watershed

 
Drainage basins of the Gulf of Mexico
Watersheds of the United States
Watersheds of Florida
Landforms of Georgia (U.S. state)
Landforms of Alabama